Otávio Pinto (born ) is a Brazilian indoor volleyball player. He is a current member of the Brazil men's national volleyball team.

Sporting achievements

Clubs
 2008/2009  Brazilian Superliga, with Minas Tênis Clube
 2016/2017  Brazilian Superliga, with Funvic Taubaté
 2018/2019  Brazilian Superliga, with Funvic Taubaté

South American Club Championship
  2013 – with Minas Tênis Clube
  2014 – with Minas Tênis Clube
  2016 – with Funvic Taubaté
  2020 – with Sada Cruzeiro

FIVB Club World Championship
  2019 – with Sada Cruzeiro
  2021 – with Sada Cruzeiro
  2022 – with Sada Cruzeiro

National team
 2013  FIVB U23 World Championship
 2015  Pan American Games
 2017  FIVB World League
 2017  South American Championship
 2017  FIVB World Grand Champions Cup

Individuals 
 2010 U21 South American Championship – "Best Blocker"
 2020 South American Club Championship – Best Middle Blocker

References

External links
 FIVB Biography

1991 births
Living people
Brazilian men's volleyball players
Place of birth missing (living people)
Pan American Games medalists in volleyball
Pan American Games silver medalists for Brazil
Volleyball players at the 2015 Pan American Games
Medalists at the 2015 Pan American Games